The Licensing Act 2003 (c 17) is an act passed by the Parliament of the United Kingdom. The act establishes a single integrated scheme for licensing premises in England and Wales used to sell or supply of alcohol, provide regulated entertainment, or provide late night refreshment. It allows some or all of these licensable activities to be contained in a single licence—the premises licence—that replaced other schemes. Responsibility for issuing licences is given to local authorities, specifically London boroughs, metropolitan boroughs, unitary authorities, and district councils, who took over this power from the Justices of the Peace under a system of Licensing Committees. It came into effect midnight, 24 November 2005.

Key measures

Key measures contained in the act include:

 Flexible opening hours
 Flexible opening hours for licensed premises, with the potential for up to 24 hour opening, seven days a week, are available. As well as the flexibility, the granting of these new type of licences is to be subject to consideration of the impact on local residents, businesses, and the expert opinion of a range of authorities in relation to the licensing objectives. This flexibility is intended to minimise public disorder resulting from a set closing time whereby numerous intoxicated individuals may leave licensed premises simultaneously at 23:00. It is also an effort to decrease the culture of "binge-drinking".
 Single premises licences
 The single integrated premises licence, bringing together the six existing licensing regimes (for alcohol, public entertainment, cinemas, theatres, late night refreshment houses, and night cafés) to cut down on bureaucracy and simplify such provisions.
 Personal licences
 A new system of personal licences relating to the supply of alcohol that enables licence holders to move more freely between premises where a premises licence is in force than is currently the case.

Licensing Committee
Each local authority must set up a Licensing Committee with between ten and fifteen members; it is assumed that most member level decisions will be made by a sub-committee of three. The committee can and is expected to have a scheme of delegation for different types of decision; this means that many applications will be decided by officers. The full committee is expected to receive monitoring reports.

The committee is not regarded as quasi-judicial (Hope and Glory Public House Ltd, R v City of Westminster Magistrates Court & Ors [2011] EWCA Civ 31), and should make its decisions in accordance with the principles of natural justice and with regard to the Human Rights Act 1998 (Articles 1, 6 and 8 of the European Convention on Human Rights are likely to be engaged). It has been suggested that councillors should not be involved in any way in decisions on premises in their ward, and the Standards Board for England has advised that only councillors who are members of the committee should have any role in considering applications.

The Licensing Act sets out four licensing objectives of no preferential order which must be taken into account and adhered to:

 The prevention of crime and disorder,
 public safety,
 prevention of public nuisance, and
 the protection of children from harm

In Scotland there is a fifth licensing objective: protecting and improving public health.

Licensable activities
The act defines "licensable activities" as:

 The retail sale of alcohol,
 the supply of alcohol in clubs,
 the provision of late night refreshment, and
 the provision of regulated entertainment

In turn, "regulated entertainment" is defined as:

 A performance of a play,
 an exhibition of a film,
 an indoor sporting event,
 a boxing or wrestling entertainment (both indoors and outdoors),
 a performance of live music,
 any playing of recorded music, or
 a performance of dance

in the presence of an audience (which may be just one person). There are exceptions (e.g., Morris dancing and similar) and refinements (e.g., karaoke is considered to be music).

"Late night refreshment" is defined as the supply of hot food or drink (i.e., food or drink that is either served at, or has been heated on the premises to, a point above ambient temperature) to the public for consumption, both on or off the premises, between 23:00 and 05:00.

Premises licences

A premises licence is required for any premises offering licensable activities. Once a licence is granted, it is valid until it is either surrendered or lapses in accordance with the act, in contrast to previous schemes, where the licence generally had to be renewed annually. The application for a premises licence requires the completion of an operating schedule, and the offering of conditions to be included on the premises licence and a plan of the premises.

A premises licence that includes the sale of alcohol must name an individual who holds a personal licence granted under the act. This person is known as the designated premises supervisor (DPS) and must sign a consent form agreeing to being named as the DPS. Applicants must serve a copy of the application on Responsible Authorities, which include: the licensing authority (the council), the police, the fire authority, the body of responsible for health and safety enforcement, the body responsible for dealing with pollution (Environmental Health), a body responsible for advising on Child Protection issues, the planning authority, and the weights and measures/trading standards authority. Responsible Authorities can make representations to the licensing authority about an application. The application must also be advertised by way of a blue notice displayed on or near to the premises for 28 days and in a local newspaper on one working day within ten working days of making the application. In addition to the Responsible Authorities, the act allows for any "other person" to make representations. If representation is made, the licensing authority must hold a hearing in most cases.

After the hearing, the authority can make one of five decisions:

 Grant the licence with conditions that match the operating schedule (and conditions can be added)
 Exclude some licensable activities from the application
 Refuse to accept the person specified as DPS (only on police advice)
 Approve different part of the premises for different activities
 Reject the application entirely. An unsuccessful applicant can appeal to the magistrates' court; an interested third party who disagrees with a decision to grant a licence can also appeal against the council's decision.

Any person or responsible authority can apply to the licensing authority for a review of an existing premises licence, with the aim of amending its conditions or revoking it entirely.

Cumulative Impact Policy
Although not specifically referred to in the original act, guidance is provided for the establishment of Cumulative Impact Zones (CIZ), which allows Licensing Authorities to designate an area as such when there is evidence that the accumulation of licensed premises within it may cause one or more of the licensing objectives to be undermined if further licences are granted.

A research study in the London Borough of Southwark found no evidence that CIZ establishment reduced the number of successful applications nor impacted on the relative proportion of licence applications receiving objections.

Cumulative Impact Assessments were formally included in the Licensing Act 2003 (as Section 5A) by the Policing and Crime Act 2017.

Personal licences
A personal licence allows a person to sell or authorise the sale of alcohol under the authority of a premises license. Anyone can apply for a personal licence to the licensing authority for the area in which they live. They must show a licensing qualification and a criminal record clean of relevant offences. The local authority can only refuse such an application on police advice. The licence lasts indefinitely after changes to legislation were made, where it had to be renewed every 10 years.

Anyone who already had a licence under the previous licensing schemes in their name – typically a pub landlord – were grandfathered without applying for a qualification.

If an applicant does not live within a local authority's area, they can apply to any authority of their choice.

Temporary event notices
Any person over 18 can serve the local authority and local police with a temporary event notice (TEN) for an event which would normally need a premises licence, but which would be for a maximum period of 168 hours, and for a maximum number of 499 people. Examples of events that could be covered by a TEN include a pub wants to stay open all weekend for a special occasion, but does not want to apply for, or cannot get, a licence allowing this all the time; or a beer tent in a summer fair. TENs also cover licensing over alcohol to clubs, entertainment or late night refreshment (serving hot food between 23:00 and 05:00). A notice currently costs £21.00.

TENs must be submitted at least ten working days before an event is due to start. Notice is given to the council responsible for the area in which the event is to be held. A copy of this notice must be sent to the police that cover that area and the Environmental Health department. The police and Environmental Health have three working days to make an objection. Anyone who does not have a personal licence can give only five notices a year, while a personal licence holder can give 50. A TEN can only be given in respect of the same premises fifteen times in a calendar year. On 25 April 2012 a late TEN was introduced, which can be submitted between five and nine working days before the event and should only be used when unforeseen circumstances lead to short notice.

There is no need for permission for a temporary event; the prospective premises user only has to formally notify the council and police that the event will take place. So long as the criteria noted above are met (as well as any others that may apply, for example, if alcohol is being sold, that provisions are in place to stop persons under the age of 18 from buying it) and the police have no objections, the event can proceed. The council cannot impose any further conditions, limitations or restrictions, but if the authority is convinced that any of the above limits will be exceeded, or they uphold a police objection (which can only be made on the grounds of crime prevention), they will issue a counter-notice which effectively cancels the TEN.

Children and the act

The act made a few important changes to the current law regarding children and alcohol, although they were not publicised at the time. For instance, a rule allowing children under eighteen years of age to sell alcohol in supermarkets is extended to all licensees, as long as "the sale or supply has been specifically approved by that or another responsible person", thus making it legal for people under 18 to work in a bar. However, children working behind bars are monitored by other legislative acts such as the Children and Young Persons Act 1933.

Someone under the age of eighteen attempting to purchase alcohol for the first time in English law is considered a criminal offence, and is punishable by a fine of up to £1,000 (or level 3 on the standard scale).

Reaction

The act has caused some controversy. Some British drinkers and many tourists are frustrated with the traditional closing time of 23:00, as opposed to the more liberal drinking regulations elsewhere in Europe and further afield, and believe extending drinking times will reduce "drinking against the clock", a precursor to binge drinking. Conversely, those against the legislation believe that binge drinking will increase, as drinkers will have more time to get drunk. One retired chief superintendent reflected that the act had “placed extraordinary demands on already stretched police resources”.

Impact on live music
The new requirement that there be a licence for the playing of live music in any venue, no matter how small, has been criticised for reducing the number of places where artists can play to tiny audiences.  There have been press stories about how the law unreasonably singles out the playing of musical instruments when compared to other forms of entertainment, such as circus performances.

To deal with the concerns raised, the Live Music Forum was set up, chaired by Feargal Sharkey. Its report, issued in July 2007, reported that overall "the Licensing Act has had a neutral effect on the UK’s live music scene", but recommended there should be more flexibility of the application of the Act on smaller premises. However, the introduction of Form 696 by the Metropolitan Police Service as part of the licensing system for live music has been criticised by Sharkey and others for the restrictions imposed on music promoters in London.

Implementation of the act
Any premises that had an old-scheme licence were able to apply for that licence to be converted; provided there was no material change in the use of the premises, the local authority was effectively bound to agree to the conversion. Licensees had to apply for this by 6 August 2005. By that date, it was reported that most pubs had applied, but many off-licences had not. Although the right to convert current licences expired on 6 August, premises could still apply as "new" premises, without benefiting from a grandfather clause. The new licensing laws came into effect at midnight on 24 November 2005.

In a report on the new legislation in November 2006, the Institute of Alcohol Studies reported that one year after implementation "opinions were divided, as expected, leading to the unavoidable polarisation of the debate, increasingly centred upon the misguided notion of ‘24 hour drinking’".

On 8 November 2007, the Department for Culture, Media and Sport reported that there were 176,400 licensed premises in England and Wales. Only 5,100 premises have 24 hour licences, most of which (65 per cent) are hotel bars. Only 460 pubs, bars, or nightclubs have 24 hour licences.

See also  	
Zoo Bar (Halifax, West Yorkshire)

References

External links
The Licensing Act 2003, as amended from the National Archives.
The Licensing Act 2003, as originally enacted from the National Archives.
Explanatory notes to the Licensing Act 2003.
Department for Culture, Media and Sport (DCMS)
Proposed changes to the Licensing Act 2003 (Home Office)
Article on the Licensing Act in Web Journal of Current Legal Issues

United Kingdom Acts of Parliament 2003
Alcohol law in the United Kingdom